Fritz Heinemann (January 1, 1864 - December 1, 1932) was a German sculptor.

Biography

Birth
Heinemann was born on January 1, 1864, in Altena.

Family

Heinemann married the daughter of a wealthy cavalry officer from Nakel in the Province of Posen, and they had two children Edith and Alexandra. In 1902, Heinemann separated from his wife, who then married the sculptor, painter and graphic artist Karl Ludwig Manzel, whose circle of acquaintances included Kaiser Wilhelm II.

Death
Heinemann died on December 1, 1932, in Berlin.

References

 

1932 deaths
1864 births
20th-century German sculptors
20th-century German male artists
German male sculptors
19th-century sculptors